Ljosåbelgen is a mountain in Sel Municipality in Innlandet county, Norway. The mountain is surrounded by several other notable mountains including Sagtindan and Indre Bråkdalshøe to the northwest, Bråkdalsbelgen to the west, Smiukampen to the southwest, Hoggbeitet and Steet to the northeast, and Trolltinden to the north.

See also
List of mountains of Norway by height

References

Sel
Mountains of Innlandet